Plozalizumab (INN; hu1D9)  is a humanized monoclonal antibody designed for the treatment of diabetic nephropathy and arteriovenous graft patency.

This drug was developed by Takeda Pharmaceuticals International Co.

References 

Monoclonal antibodies